Highway 40 is a north-south intercity road in Israel. At 302 km long, it is the second longest highway in Israel, after Highway 90. The highway runs from Kfar Saba in the center of Israel to the Arabah in the south, serving as a main connection between central Israel and Be'er Sheva.

Route description
The highway starts at an intersection with Highway 90 near Ketura, about 50 km north of Eilat as a two-lane undivided road. It then continues north, winding through the mountains of the southern Negev. This section includes the "Meishar", which is a completely straight and leveled 12 km stretch of road. The highway descends into the Ramon Crater, crosses it and then ascends 250 meters along "Ma'ale HaAtzmaut" to reach Mitzpe Ramon. From Mitzpe Ramon the highway continues past Ramon Air Force Base and Sde Boker.

The section between Ketura and Sde Boker is a scenic route, and some drivers use this road when driving to Eilat because it provides more attractions and scenery, as opposed to highway 90 which is considered to be safer and faster.

From Sde Boker the highway continues past numerous Bedouin settlements and the Ramat Hovav industrial area. Between Nokdim Junction and Goral Junction the highway forms an eastern bypass of Be'er Sheva, also passing Omer and the Bedouin towns of Shaqib al-Salam and Tel as-Sabi. From Goral Junction the highway continues as a dual-carriageway four lane road, passing Lehavim, Rahat and Kiryat Gat. 

North of Kiryat Malakhi, the highway merges with Highway 3 for 4 km to Re'em Junction. This short section has six lanes (three in each direction). It then continues as a four lane road, passing through Gedera and past Tel Nof Air Force Base and Rehovot. Between Matzliah Junction and Gesher Lod Junction it forms an eastern bypass of Ramle and Lod.

At El Al Junction the highway turns left towards Ben Gurion International Airport and immediately right at a roundabout. It is then downgraded in size to two lanes until IAI Junction, where it becomes a four lane divided carriageway once again. The highway then continues through Petah Tikva and bypasses Hod HaSharon before terminating at an intersection with Highway 55 in Kfar Saba.

Junctions and interchanges

The following junctions and interchanges are listed from south to north.

References

See also

List of highways in Israel

40